PAS Macau Racing Team is a Macanese auto racing team based in Taipa, Macau. The team currently races in the TCR Asia Series. Having previously competed in the World Touring Car Championship in 2013.

World Touring Car Championship

Honda Accord Euro-R (2013)
The team entered the 2013 World Touring Car Championship season with Eurico de Jesus driving a Honda Accord Euro R.

TCR Asia Series

Honda Civic TCR (2015–)
The team will enter the 2015 TCR Asia Series season with Henry Ho driving a Honda Civic TCR.

External links

References

Macau auto racing teams
World Touring Car Championship teams
TCR International Series teams

TCR Asia Series teams